Serra de Na Burguesa (Balearic , formerly Serra de Portopí or Sierra de Porto Pi, meaning "Port of Pine Mountain") is a well-defined mountain on the island of Majorca, part of the Spanish autonomous community of the Balearic Islands.  It is the southernmost portion of the Serra de Tramuntana range, terminating in the Mediterranean Sea at Bay of Palma.  Na Burguesa is located approximately halfway between Santa Ponsa and Palma.  The municipality of Calvià is located between Na Burguesa and Serra de Tramuntana.

History

The mountain's name of Serra de Portopí predates the name Serra de Na Burguesa. Serra de Portopí gained historical significance in 1229 when King James II of Aragon crossed it with his troops, and regained Palma for Spain from the occupying Moors. In present day, Portopí refers to a neighborhood located in the district west of Palma de Mallorca.  The later name,  Serra de Na Burguesa, honors Francesc Burgués, the Solicitor-General of the Spanish Crown, who, from the early sixteenth century, owned the Bendinat farm at the foot of the mountain.  Bendinat is now a residential zone in Calvià.

Geography
Fire tracks now traverse the entire crest of Na Burguesa. There are numerous cave systems on Na Burguesa, and important archaeological discoveries have been made in the caves.

Mirador de n'Alzamora is a natural terrace on Na Burguesa.  Until the early twentieth century, summer grazing herds could be found in the Coll dels Pastors , the mountain's central highlands. High levels of chlorides have been found in some of the mountain's aquifers.

Fauna and flora
It is characterized by a significant mass of pine trees and Mediterranean maquis.  In addition, there are oaks, strawberry trees, roses, wild gladiola, and flowering shrubs. There are lizards, butterflies and insects.

Tourism
Na Burguesa is popular amongst tourists for its walking and mountain biking trails.

References

Further reading
 Gran Enciclopèdia Catalana, "Serra de Porto Pi y Francesc Burgues", Barcelona (Enciclopèdia Catalana, SA), 1992, (Catalan)
 Magnus Mörner:  La expedición del Marqués de La Romana . Magnus Mörner: La Expedición del Marqués de La Romana. Fundación Instituto de Empresa. Fundación Instituto de Empresa. Madrid, 2007. (Spanish)

Mountains of Mallorca
Mountains of the Balearic Islands